Manalipa (also known as Malanipa) is one of the 28 offshore islands of the City of Zamboanga in southern Philippines.

Location

Communities
The barangay of Manalipa, the lone community on the island, has population of 1,674 (as of August 1, 2007).

Features
Scuba diving is very good around the island.

See also 
 List of islands of the Philippines

References

Islands of Zamboanga City
Barangays of Zamboanga City